Appointment with Death is a 1988 American mystery film and sequel produced and directed by Michael Winner. Made by Golan-Globus Productions, the film is an adaptation of the 1938 Agatha Christie novel Appointment with Death featuring the detective Hercule Poirot. The screenplay was written by Winner as well as Peter Buckman and Anthony Shaffer.

The film stars Peter Ustinov as Poirot, along with Lauren Bacall, Carrie Fisher, John Gielgud, Piper Laurie, Hayley Mills, Jenny Seagrove and David Soul. It is a follow-up to numerous other theatrical and made-for-television adaptions starring Ustinov, as well as 1974's Murder On The Orient-Express.

It marks Ustinov's final portrayal of Hercule Poirot.

Plot
Emily Boynton, stepmother to the three Boynton children – Lennox, Raymond, and Carol – and mother to Ginevra, blackmails the family lawyer, Jefferson Cope, into destroying her late husband's second will that left them $200,000 each, which would free them from Mrs. Boynton's domination.

She takes the stepchildren and Nadine, her daughter-in-law serving as a nurse, on holiday to Europe. In Trieste, the great detective Hercule Poirot runs into an old friend, Dr. Sarah King. Sarah soon falls in love with Raymond Boynton, to Emily's disapproval.

Lady Westholme is introduced. She was born American but has had British nationality for the last ten years due to her marriage, during which she became an MP. She, archaeologist Miss Quinton, and lawyer Jefferson Cope (the same) are also on their way to Jerusalem and Qumran.

The Boynton family are surprised to see Cope on board the ship. The adult step-children discover the existence of a second will since their father told Lennox before he died but no one can prove this. Emily continues to bully her step-children. Cope is flirting with Nadine who overtly accepts his courting. He also resists Emily's demand that he stay away from them. Emily poisons Cope's wine, but this is spilt when Nadine's husband thumps Cope, having found an engraved cigarette case given to Nadine by Cope. Poirot observes a fly drinking from the spill and dying, and keeps a close eye on the family when they disembark.

At the archaeological dig, Cope, Nadine, Lennox, Carol, Raymond and Dr King go for a walk, but Lennox turns back, upset by his wife's preference for Cope. Later the others return one by one. Dr King notices an Arab man hovering over Emily. When she goes over, she finds Emily dead. Dr King thinks Emily died of a heart attack but Poirot points out it is wise to be suspicious when there is a death of someone who is widely hated. He asks Dr King to check her medical bag and she finds it disordered, with an empty bottle of digitalis and there is a missing syringe.

Poirot deduces that Mrs. Boynton was injected with a lethal dose of digitalis, corresponding to a medicine she took that was usually administered by Nadine, in order that her death appear to be by natural causes. Since the family could have altered her medication without needing an additional syringe, he suspects an outsider.

There is an altercation in the street, a gun is fired and an Arab boy is killed. Dr King is accused, but Poirot has her released so she can travel with him to meet the others for a 'picnic' where he plans to reveal what happened. Having suggested that all the step-children lied about seeing their step-mother alive when she was dead (thinking one of them may have done it and wishing to delay or protect them against discovery), he reveals the truth: Lady Westholme is the murderer. She was once in prison and Emily had recognised her from her time as a prison warden. To keep her quiet and maintain her status, Lady Westholme had resorted to murder.

Cast
 Peter Ustinov as Hercule Poirot
 Lauren Bacall as Lady Westholme
 Carrie Fisher as Nadine Boynton
 John Gielgud as Colonel Carbury
 Piper Laurie as Emily Boynton
 Hayley Mills as Miss Quinton
 Jenny Seagrove as Dr. Sarah King
 David Soul as Jefferson Cope
 Nicholas Guest as Lennox Boynton
 Valerie Richards as Carol Boynton
 John Terlesky as Raymond Boynton
 Amber Bezer as Ginevra Boynton
 Douglas Sheldon as Captain Rogers
 Mike Sarne as Healey
 Michael Craig as Lord Peel

Production
Filming took place in Israel. The denouement takes place at the Springs of Sataf.

Director Michael Winner had become known for violent films but this represented a change of pace. "You won't see Lauren Bacall walking around machine-gunning everyone," he said. "In fact, it's my first picture in years that was under budget on blood." There were plans for Winner to adapt another Agatha Christie tale for the film the following year, but this did not happen.

Reception
The film received a mixed reception. Vincent Canby wrote in The New York Times that the film "is not up to the stylish standard of the earlier all-star, Hercule Poirot mysteries, especially Sidney Lumet's Murder on the Orient Express. The pleasures of the form are not inexhaustible, and this time the physical production looks sort of cut-rate." Michael Wilmington of the Los Angeles Times blasted the film as "unsatisfying, even a little soporific [with a] tendency to blame co-writer-producer-director Michael Winner, whose 1978 adaptation of "The Big Sleep" ruined the story by translating its action from Los Angeles in the 1930s to London in the 1970s." Another blasting of the film came from Variety, whose reviewer wrote: "Peter Ustinov hams his way through Appointment with Death one more time as ace Belgian detective 'Hercuool Pwarow,' but neither he nor glitz can lift the pic from an impression of little more than a routine whodunit. Even the normally amusing Ustinov looks a bit jaded in his third big-screen outing as the sleuth, as well as several TV productions. Director Michael Winner has some fine Israeli locations to play with, but his helming is only lackluster, the script and characterizations bland, and there simply are not enough murders to sustain the interest of even the most avid Agatha Christie fan." Critic David Aldridge, from an issue of Film Review magazine dated May 1988, classified the film as "another loser from Winner, though, to give the man some small due, even a more talented director would have floundered forcing freshness in such formularised fare." He also criticized Cannon Films for the production value of a film that ostensibly was shot on an exotic location, with the quote: "But, then, it is a Cannon Film and they're not known for spending a penny when a halfpenny would just about do. Good for TV."

Box office
The film failed at the box office.

Changes
The novel takes place primarily in Petra, Jordan, whereas the film takes place in Jerusalem and Qumran (near the Dead Sea). This change was made because the production company of Yoram Globus and
Menahem Golan was based in Israel.

DVD availability
Appointment with Death is the only one of the six films in which Peter Ustinov portrayed Hercule Poirot that's never been released on Region 1 DVD for U.S. and Canadian home video.

References

External links

1988 films
1980s mystery films
American mystery films
1980s English-language films
Films based on Hercule Poirot books
Golan-Globus films
American detective films
Films directed by Michael Winner
Films set in Jerusalem
Films shot in Israel
Films with screenplays by Anthony Shaffer
Films scored by Pino Donaggio
Films with screenplays by Michael Winner
Films produced by Michael Winner
Films with screenplays by Peter Buckman
Films produced by Menahem Golan
Films produced by Yoram Globus
1980s American films